Pabos may refer to:

 Pabos, Quebec, former name of Chandler, a town in the Gaspésie–Îles-de-la-Madeleine region of Quebec, Canada
 Grand-Pabos, former seigneurie of New France
 Petit-Pabos, a community within the city of Grande-Rivière, Quebec

See also
 Pabo (disambiguation)
 Grand Pabos River, a river in the Gaspé Peninsula of Quebec
 Grand Pabos West River, a river in the Gaspé Peninsula of Quebec
 Petit Pabos River, a river in the Gaspé Peninsula of Quebec